Andriy Yakymiv (born 15 June 1997) is a Ukrainian professional footballer who plays as a midfielder.

Career
Yakymiv is a product of the UFK Lviv youth team system playing at the Ukrainian Youth Football League. In 2014 he signed with FC Karpaty Lviv for which he played only in the Ukrainian Premier League Reserves.

Beginning in summer 2016 he played for FC Stal Kamianske, making his senior debut and scoring the winning goal against FC Zorya Luhansk on 16 July 2017 in the Ukrainian Premier League.

References

External links
Profile at FFU Official Site (Ukr)

1997 births
Living people
People from Chervonohrad
Ukrainian footballers
Ukrainian Premier League players
FC Stal Kamianske players
FC Desna Chernihiv players
Kaposvári Rákóczi FC players
FC Chornomorets Odesa players
FC Inhulets Petrove players
Nõmme Kalju FC players
Ukrainian expatriate footballers
Expatriate footballers in Hungary
Ukrainian expatriate sportspeople in Hungary
Ukrainian expatriate sportspeople in Estonia
Association football midfielders
Ukrainian First League players
Sportspeople from Lviv Oblast